Brondesbury is on the North London line, on a viaduct crossing Kilburn High Road in the Brondesbury area of Kilburn in the London Borough of Brent in north-west London.

It is approximately 200 metres south-east of  station and half a mile north-west of  station.

Ticket barriers are now in operation.

History

Brondesbury station opened on 2 January 1860 as Edgeware  Road (Kilburn) station on the Hampstead Junction Railway. It was renamed several times: Edgware Road on 1 November 1865, Edgware Road and Brondesbury on 1 January 1872, Brondesbury (Edgware Road) on 1 January 1873, Brondesbury on 1 May 1883. A signal box was in use at the station until 5 February 1962.

A number of plans were put forward between 1890 and 1926 to build an underground railway along the Edgware Road, and would have seen the construction of a Tube station at Brondesbury. None of the schemes succeeded and no such line was ever built.

Services
Brondesbury currently has the following London Overground (North London line) services, which are operated by Class 378 trainsets.

Off-peak:

6tph to Stratford
4tph to Richmond
2tph to Clapham Junction

Connections
London Buses routes 16, 32, 189, 316, 332 and 632 and night route N16 serve the station.

Future improvements
Brondesbury was planned to become a step-free station and the project will be completed in 2017.

References

External links

Railway stations in the London Borough of Brent
Former London and North Western Railway stations
Railway stations in Great Britain opened in 1860
Railway stations served by London Overground